Fright Night Film Fest, also known as Louisville Fright Night Film Fest, is an annual horror film festival in Louisville, Kentucky. The festival was first founded in 2005 by Ken Daniels and is typically held in July at the Galt House, which is famous for housing guests for the Kentucky Derby. The focus of the Fright Night Film Fest focuses on genre films such as  horror, science fiction, fantasy, action, and cult from around the world including new films from Asia, Africa, Middle East, Latin America, Europe and North America.

Kentucky-made films such as "Dead Moon Rising", "Hell is Full" and "Stash" got distribution by screenings at this film festival with horror convention and now the convention has expanded to include Fandomfest, a showcase of pop culture, gaming and cosplay. Awards such as the Corman award are presented to films, actors, or directors that excel within their respective categories. Many of the filmmakers have garnered distribution and representation as a result of the notable festival among Hollywood horror filmmakers. Fright Night Film Fest launches careers internationally. In 2013, The organizers announced that during the 2012 Fright Night Film Fest packed with over 16,700 people, and it screened more than 120 films within three days. Some of the largest horror online publications have called it the "Sundance of Horror".

The horror magazine Horror Hound has sponsored the festival for many years and called it "the largest genre film festival in the country." Moreover, the Louisville government publicly announced that this film festival is the country's largest genre-specific film festival.

After the last film fest in 2017, Fright Night Film Fest 2020 was held on October 3, 2020.

Award winners

2006
 Best Picture - The Hazing
 Best Short - Fangs for the memories and Disconnected
 Best Soundtrack  - Silence of Isbella
 Best Cinematography - Nightmare Man
 Best of the Fest Audience Award - Katie Bird and Bad Reputation
 Most Original Film Award - Secret Life of Sarah Sheldon
 Best Zombie Film Award - Dead Lands:The Rising
 Best Special Effects Award - Edison Death Machine
 Honorable Mention - Joshua

2007
 Best Feature - Scrapbook
 Best Short - Woman's Intuition
 Best Soundtrack - Gimme Skelter
 Best Special Effects - Horrors of War
 Best Zombie - Dead Moon Rising
 Best Foreign Horror Film - Bad Dreams (Sweden)
 Most Original Idea - The Guardian (Dir. Aaron Marshall)
 Horror Icon of the Year - Tony Moran (actor) 
 Honorable Mention - Salvation (J.A. Steel)
 Honorable Mention - 9 Lives of Mara (Balaji K. Kumar)
 Honorable Mention - Burial Party (Joseph Dodge)
 Honorable Mention - The Day They Came Back (Scott Goldberg)

2008
 Best Action - Razor Sharp
 Best Actor - Trent Haaga
 Best Actress - Monica Knight (Windcroft)
 Best of the Fest - Bonnie and Clyde vs. Dracula
 Best Cinematography - Lily (Daniel Boneville)
 Best Feature - Windcroft (Dir. Evan Meszaros)
 Best Comedy - Shh! It's Alive (Dir. Ryan Cadima)
 Most Original Film - Gunther Today's Happy Time Fun Show (Dir. JImmy Humphrey)
 Best Sci Fi - O2
 Best Director- Evan Meszaros
 Best Short - Of Darkness (Dir. Gary E. Irwin)
 Best One Liner - Zombie Apocalypse
 Best Zombie - Zombthology (Dir. Elias Dansey, Chris Kiros, Robert Elkins)
 Best Soundtrack - Zombie Love
 Best Special Effects - Curse of the Flesh
 Kentucky Filmmaker of the Year - George Bonilla
 Horror Icon of the Year - Angus Scrimm 
 Honorable Mention - Paper Dolls
 Honorable Mention - Liar's Pendulum
 Honorable Mention - Alone
 Honorable Mention - Taste of the Flesh
 Honorable Mention - The Conjurer
 Honorable Mention - The Vagrant
 Honorable Mention - Miyuki

2009
 Best Short - Double
 Best Foreign Short - The Gynecologist
 Best Foreign Feature - Family Demons
 Best Soundtrack/Score - Eat Me: The Musical
 Best SPFX Practical - Devil's Grove
 Best Action - The Dogs of Chinatown
 Best Sci Fi - Fun on Earth
 Best Zombie - Deadlands2:Trapped
 Best Comedy - Auburn Hills Breakdown
 Best Director- Jack Daniel Stanley
 Best Fan Film - Indiana Jones and the Mummies Skull
 Best Feature - Mantra
 Best Animated - Night of the Invisible Man (Dir. Tyler Meyer)
 Best Cinematographer - Huneman Brown Eagle for Mrs. Brummets Garden
 Best Actor - Ron Pallio Curse of Micha Rood
 Best Actress - Cassandra Kane Family Demons
 Best of the Year - Sea of Dust
 Honorable Mention - Shellter
 Honorable Mention - Alone
 Honorable Mention - The Revenant
 Honorable Mention - I Don't Sleep I Dream
 Honorable Mention - Run! Bitch Run!
 Honorable Mention - The Vagrant
 Honorable Mention - Blood on the Highway
 Honorable Mention - Bikini Girls on Ice
 Honorable Mention - Thirsty
 Honorable Mention - Dead Sucks

2010
 Best Short - Alice Jacobs Is Dead (Dir. Alex Horwitz)
 Best Feature - Shadowland (Dir. Wyatt Weed)
 Best Soundtrack/Score - Danger Zombies Run (Dir. Brian Wimer)
 Scream Queen of the Year -  Heather Langenkamp 
 Best Special FX Practical - The Taken (FX. Brian Sipe)
 Best Screenplay - The Ripper (Joe Randazzo)
 Best Action- God of Vampires
 Best Sci Fi - Flying Saucer Exodus (Dir. Jerry Williams)
 Best Zombie - Revelation (Dir. Will Graver)
 Best Comedy - Danger, Zombies, Run
 Best Director - Morgan Mead (My Bloody Wedding)
 Best Fan Film - Hell Raiser: Deader Winters Lament (Dir. Jonathan S. Kui)
 Best Documentary - Graphic Sexual Horror (Dir. Barbara Bell)
 Kentucky Filmmaker of the Year - Jacob Ennis
 Best Cinematography - The Prometheus Project
 Best Actor - Kane Hodder Old Habits Die Hard
 Best Actress - Jessica Von The Taken
 Horror Icon of the Year - Tom Atkins 
 Best of the Fest - The Taken (Dir. Richard Valentine)
 Audience Pick - My Bloody Wedding (Dir. Morgan Mead)
 Honorable Mention - Gun Town (Dir. Lee Vervoort)
 Honorable Mention - Get Off My Porch (Dir. Patrick Rea)
 Honorable Mention - The Survivors (Dir. Soham Mehta)
 Honorable Mention - Moon-Lite (Dir. Kenneth Dowell)
 Honorable Mention - Nightmare at Bunnyman Bridge (Dir. Robert Elkins)
 Lifetime Achievement Award - Roger Corman

2011
 Best Actor - John Wells Overtime
 Best Actress - Sebrina Siegel Overtime
 Best Director - Darrin Dickerson (D4)
 Best Screenplay - The Resurrection of Blake House (Steven C. Gladstone and Joe Randazzo)
 Best Cinematography - Brian Cunningham Overtime
 Best Soundtrack - Jason Paige Overtime
 Best Action - Overtime (Dir. Brian Cunningham, Matt Niehoff)
 Lifetime Achievement Award - John Carpenter 
 Best of the Fest - Overtime
 Best Feature - D4
 Best One-Liner - Overtime
 Filmmakers of the Year - Brian Cunningham, Matt Niehoff Overtime

2012
 Lifetime Achievement Award- John Rhys-Davies 
 Best Foreign Short-Moxina (Dir. Ryota Nakanishi)
 Best Foreign Feature-Muirhouse
 Best Short-The Keeper
 Best Feature-A Little Bit Zombie
 Best Director-Patrick Rea for Nailbiter
 Best Of the Fest-Nailbiter
 Best "Grindhouse" Film-The Terrifier
 Best Zombie Film-A Little Bit Zombie
 Best Soundtrack-Below Zero
 Best Cinematography-An Evening With My Comatose Mother
 Best Screenplay The Man Who Killed Sandra Wallace by Anders Nelson
 Best Practical SPFX-Huff
 Best CGI-Fallout
 Best Action Film-Fallout
 Best Sci Fi Film-Ray Bradbury's Kaliedoscope
 Best Fan Film-Justice League Auditions
 Best Comedy-A Little Bit Zombie
 Best Documentary-Beast Wishes
 KY Filmmaker of the Year-David Heavener
 Horror Icon of the Year-Sid Haig 
 Best Animated-(Computer)-Lola
 Best Animated-(Practical)-Odokuro
 Best Actress Kristin Booth for Below Zero
 Best Actor Lance Henriksen for It's in the Blood

2013
  Best Feature (Horror Category) Cannon Fodder
  Kentucky Filmmakers of the Year Biting Pig Productions
  Best Screenplay (Horror) Sadistic by Michael Gibrall
  Best Screenplay (Fantasy) Biofusionoid Wen-Chia Chang
  Best Screenplay (SciFi) Bounty Hounter by Amy McCorkle and Melissa Goodman
  Best Zombie Film-NI-28
  Best Cinematography Fortune Cookie Prophecies
  Best Soundtrack NI-28
  Best Foreign Feature Dunderland
  Best Foreign Short REFUGIO 115
  Best Super Short THE RISING
  Best Action 95 ECHOERS
  Best Short Film In Between
  Best Feature (Sci Fi) Space Milkshake
  Best Special FX (Practical makeup) Cannon Fodder
  Best Special FX (CGI) 95 ECHOERS
  Best Comedy Motivational Growth
  Best Director Armen Evrensel for Space Milkshake
  Best of The Fest Space Milkshake
  Honorable Mentions
  She's Having a Baby 
  Thirteen
  Daughters
  Blood Sucka Jones
  Sader Ridge

Guest celebrities

2013
 William Shatner 
 Stan Lee
 Gillian Anderson
 Gene Simmons
 Norman Reedus
 Michael Rooker     
 Lew Temple
 Adrian Paul
 Adam Baldwin
 Jewel Staite
 Alan Tudyk
 Saul Rubinek
 Grant Wilson
 Jason David Frank
 Garry Chalk
 Gene Simmons
 Kevin Smith
 Jason Mewes
 Kane Hodder
 Jon Bernthal
 Fred Dekker

2014
 Doug Bradley
 Ken Foree
 John Kassir
 Jeff Reddick
 Don Shanks
 Tamara Glynn
 Matthew Walker
 Erik Preston
 Leslie Hoffman
 Ira Heiden
 Bradley Gregg
 Jennifer Rubin

See also
 List of attractions and events in the Louisville metropolitan area

References

External links
 

Film festivals established in 2005
Festivals in Louisville, Kentucky
Fantasy and horror film festivals in the United States
2005 establishments in Kentucky
July events